Team Lioness refers to the female US Marines who were used to respect local customs regarding the prohibition of men touching or searching local women during operations in Iraq and Afghanistan.  Team Lioness, considered one of the forerunners of the now official FETs (Female Engagement Teams), went out and distributed information to local women and families and gathered intelligence.

Team Lioness 

The successes of Team Lioness and the later FETs is still under review, a report is due but no date has been set for its release. More American servicewomen have been killed and wounded resulting from hostile action in the Iraq War than in any other previous war, but this has more to do with the fact that there are more US servicewomen performing more missions than in any previous conflict. 

Official policy barred the armed services from assigning women to direct ground combat units in most situations. Instead, when commanders want to put talented women soldiers on combat teams, they must do so by temporarily "attaching" them to those units, or sending them in a support role, rather than an official combat role, thus Team Lioness was "attached," but not assigned to infantry units.  Their role was one of pacifying and attempting to win the hearts and minds of the local population.

Documentary 

A documentary titled Lioness covered one of the first members of Team Lioness in Ramadi, Iraq between 2003 and 2004.  Since its release in 2008, Lioness has contributed significantly to the mainstreaming of the movement to recognize and respond to the needs of American servicewomen. 

As a catalyst for military-civilian dialogue, the film has led to tangible change in a number of arenas by framing an important but largely invisible issue in meaningful human terms. Among the film’s notable accomplishments is its integration into the national veteran and Department of Defense healthcare infrastructures as a training tool for VA and military healthcare personnel.  The film has also played a pivotal role in the passage of two critical pieces of legislation improving women veterans' access to healthcare in the VA system. The Women Veterans Healthcare Improvement Act, designed to increase availability of gender-specific services for women, was signed into law by President Obama on May 5, 2010, as part of the Caregivers and Veterans Omnibus Health Services Act. The Compensation Owed for Mental Health Based on Activities in Theater Post-traumatic Stress Disorder Act  expanded the definition of combat, making it easier for all veterans to qualify for combat-related disability benefits.

References

Women in the Iraq War
Women in the United States military
Ad hoc units and formations of the United States
All-female military units and formations